Modupe Enitan Irele is a Nigerian diplomat and current Nigerian Ambassador to France, becoming the first female to hold the role since the diplomatic mission appointed its first representative in 1966. She was nominated by President Muhammadu Buhari on 20 October 2016, and presented her credentials to President Macron on 18 December 2017.

Career and education 

Modupe Irele was born in Nigeria, and gained her Bachelor’s Degree in English with a minor in French from the University of Ibadan. She proceeded to gain her Master's from the same institution. Modupe earned a second Master's degree in education from University College Dublin. In 1996, she earned her doctorate from Penn State University focusing on Online Learning and Teacher Training.

Irele began her career in banking, spending 15 years as a retail banker, before venturing into education consulting. She runs her own educational consulting practice in Nigeria, Key Learning Solutions and served in the Faculty of Department and Learning and Performance Systems at the Penn State University Department of Education.

References 

Living people
Nigerian politicians
Year of birth missing (living people)
Nigerian diplomats
Pennsylvania State University alumni
Alumni of University College Dublin
Yoruba people